Valeria Vladimirovna Barsova (Astrakhan, 13 June 1892 – Sochi, 13 December 1967), PAU, was a Russian operatic soprano, one of the leading lyric-coloratura sopranos of the first half of the 20th century in Russia.

Life and career

Valeria Barsova first studied the piano with Estonian composer Artur Kapp. She then studied singing at the Moscow Conservatory with Mazetti. In 1915, she was singing in a Moscow cabaret when she was noticed by Sergei Zimin, director of the Zimin Opera, where she made her operatic debut in 1917, as Gilda in Rigoletto. Other roles at this theatre included; Susanna in Le nozze di Figaro, Constance in Die Entführung aus dem Serail, Rosina in Il barbiere di Siviglia, the four heroines of Les contes d'Hoffmann, Nedda in Pagliacci.

In 1919, she sang Rosina as a last minute replacement for prima-donna Antonina Nezhdanova, at the Hermitage Theatre in Saint Petersburg, opposite Feodor Chaliapin. She then appeared at the Stanislavski Theatre and the Nemirovich-Danchenko Theatre, notably as Clairette in La fille de Madame Angot.

She finally made her debut at the Bolshoi Theatre in 1920 where she was to sing every seasons until 1948. Besides Italian and French roles such as Gilda, Violetta, Mimì, Butterfly, Juliette, Manon, she also excelled in Russian operas, notably the leading female roles in works such as Ruslan and Lyudmila, The Snow Maiden, A Life for the Tsar, Sadko, The Queen of Spades, The Golden Cockerel.

In 1929, she sang in concert in Berlin and made a tour of Poland.

After retiring from the stage, she taught at the Moscow Conservatory from 1950 until 1953. She retired in Sochi on the Black Sea, where she died at 75.

References
 "Barsowa Valeria", Operissimo.com

1892 births
1967 deaths
People from Astrakhan
People from Astrakhan Governorate
Communist Party of the Soviet Union members
Members of the Supreme Soviet of the Russian Soviet Federative Socialist Republic, 1938–1947
Soviet women opera singers
Actresses from the Russian Empire
Russian film actresses
Russian operatic sopranos
Soviet film actresses
20th-century Russian actresses
Soviet sopranos
Moscow Conservatory alumni
Academic staff of Moscow Conservatory
People's Artists of the USSR
Stalin Prize winners
Recipients of the Order of Lenin
Recipients of the Order of the Red Banner of Labour